The 1963 Scottish League Cup final was played on 26 October 1963 at Hampden Park in Glasgow and it was the final of the 18th Scottish League Cup competition. The final was contested by Rangers and Morton, and Rangers won by a score of 5–0.

Match details

See also
Played between the same teams:
1922 Scottish Cup Final
1948 Scottish Cup Final

References

External links 
 Soccerbase

1963
League Cup Final
Scottish League Cup Final 1963
Scottish League Cup Final 1963
1960s in Glasgow
October 1963 sports events in the United Kingdom